Lena Chettiar (born S. M. Letchuman Chettiar) was an Indian film producer from Chettinad known for his works in Tamil cinema.

Career 
S. M. Letchuman Chettiar hailed from the Nattukottai Nagarathar clan in Chettinad. Early on in his career, Lena was known for staging plays in southern Tamil-speaking areas and was a used car dealer, who became the first person to circulate handbills about cars in Tamil. He advised M. K. Thyagaraja Bhagavathar, a stage actor, against producing films. Bhagavathar's first film Pavalakkodi, which ran well in Tamil-speaking areas of India and Ceylon (now Sri Lanka), marked the debut of Lena as a film producer. Soon after the release of Pavalakkodi, Lena moved to and managed his own production unit titled Krishna Pictures, which marked the Tamil debut of P. Kannamba. Lena was never credited as producer in any of his films as he was an "undischarged insolvent" in the later half of his life, because of which he could not carry on any business under his name. According to historian Randor Guy, he died "unsung and unhonoured".

Filmography

References

Bibliography 
 

20th-century Indian dramatists and playwrights
20th-century Indian film directors
Film directors from Tamil Nadu
Indian lyricists
Screenwriters from Tamil Nadu
Tamil film directors
Tamil film poets
Tamil film producers
Tamil screenwriters